Gabriela Sabatini was the defending champion but did not compete that year.

Pam Shriver won in the final 7–5, 6–1 against Helena Suková.

Seeds
A champion seed is indicated in bold text while text in italics indicates the round in which that seed was eliminated. The top four seeds received a bye to the second round.

  Pam Shriver (champion)
  Manuela Maleeva (semifinals)
  Helena Suková (final)
  Natasha Zvereva (quarterfinals)
  Larisa Savchenko (semifinals)
  Catarina Lindqvist (first round)
  Anne Minter (quarterfinals)
  Patty Fendick (second round)

Draw

Final

Section 1

Section 2

External links
 ITF tournament edition details

Pan Pacific Open
Pan Pacific Open - Singles
1988 in Japanese tennis